"God Bless the Child" is a song co-written and recorded by Canadian country music artist Shania Twain. It was released in October 1996 as the eighth and final single from her second studio album The Woman in Me (1995). The song was written by Twain and an extended version co-written by Mutt Lange. The song became Twain's first single off The Woman in Me to not hit the top 40 at country radio. The original album version is more a poem than a song, done completely a cappella. For radio airplay, the song had to be expanded lyrically and musically. It was included on Twain's Come on Over Tour usually accompanied by a local choir, and on Australian and Asian tour editions of the Come On Over album. All singles sales from the United States were donated to Second Harvest/Kids Cafe, and from Canada to Breakfast for Learning. Twain performed the song at the 1996 Country Music Association Awards.

Critical reception
Entertainment Weekly gave the song a fairly favorable review, giving it a B grade and saying "while her sentiments are pretty naive, her pipes sound plenty experienced" and that Twain gives "enough passion to make us temporarily forget her pinup looks".

Music video
The music video for "God Bless the Child" was shot in Nashville, Tennessee and directed by Larry Jordan. It was filmed on October 3, 1996, and debuted on October 26, 1996, on CMT. The video features two choirs.  One included the Fisk University Jubilee Singers and the second was a local performing arts choirs singing along with Twain in a hangar at the Nashville airport. Two versions of the video were released, one with the banjo included in the audio for country stations, another without for pop and international stations. The "banjo version" video is available on Twain's DVD The Platinum Collection.

"God Bless the Child" is one of Twain's least-viewed videos on YouTube, with just over 3.4 million views as of October 2020.

Chart performance
"God Bless the Child" debuted on the Billboard Hot Country Singles & Tracks chart the week of November 30, 1996 at number 74. The song spent 9 weeks on the chart and climbed to a peak position of number 48 on January 11, 1997, where it remained for one week. The song became Twain's only single from The Woman in Me to miss the top 30. It did however, top the Country Singles Sales chart for one week. Despite failure at country radio, "God Bless the Child" became Twain's fourth appearance on the Billboard Hot 100 where it peaked at number 75. It also reached number 50 on the Hot 100 Singles Sales chart.

Track listing
US Single
 "God Bless the Child" (New Previously Unreleased Version) – 3:48
 "(If You're Not in It for Love) I'm Outta Here!" (Remix) 4:21

Canada Maxi-CD
 "God Bless the Child" – 3:49
 "(If You're Not In It for Love) I'm Outta Here!" (Remix) – 4:40
 "Whose Bed Have Your Boots Been Under?" (Dance Mix) – 4:50
 "The Woman in Me (Needs the Man in You)" (Steel Guitarless Mix) – 4:50

Official versions
Album Version (1:30)
Single Mix - Country Version (3:49) 
Single Mix - Without Banjo (3:49)

Charts

Weekly charts

Year-end charts

Decade-end charts

Notes

1996 singles
Charity singles
Canadian Singles Chart number-one singles
Shania Twain songs
Songs written by Robert John "Mutt" Lange
Song recordings produced by Robert John "Mutt" Lange
Songs written by Shania Twain
Mercury Records singles
Mercury Nashville singles
Country ballads
1995 songs